In Poland, zaścianek (literally: "[place] behind the wall") was historically a village where petty nobility (drobna szlachta) lived, especially in Mazovia and Podlachia. The derived adjective zaściankowy means out-of-the-way or narrow-minded.

See also
 Zaścianek, Podlaskie Voivodeship

Polish words and phrases
Rural geography